Jiang Ping, courtesy name Zechang, is a fictional Song dynasty knight-errant from the 19th-century Chinese novels The Seven Heroes and Five Gallants and The Five Younger Gallants. Nicknamed "River Rat" or "River-Overturning Rat" for his amazing swimming and freediving skills, he is able to stay underwater seemingly forever. He is the fourth sworn brother of the "Five Rats", whose other members are Lu Fang, Han Zhang, Xu Qing and Bai Yutang.

Highly witty, Jiang Ping is one of the most colorful characters in the original novel. He is scrawny, and his appearance more of a sick patient than a fighter, yet he often outsmarts opponents with clever tricks, disguises or lies. Researcher Susan Blader considers him the only "gallant" "whose intellectual, emotional, and physical prowess compares favourably with that of any 'heroes'".

References

The Seven Heroes and Five Gallants characters
Fictional characters from Jiangsu
Literary characters introduced in 1879